Aslan Esbolaiuly Musin (Aslan Esbolaıuly Mýsın; born 2 January 1954) is a retired Kazakh politician who is the former Chair of Majilis of the Parliament of Kazakhstan. He has served as the Deputy Prime Minister of Kazakhstan since 10 January 2007. and previously served as Minister of Economy and Budget Planning of Kazakhstan from 4 October 2006 to 9 January 2007. Prior to that he served as the Äkim of Atyrau Region. On 13 October 2008, he was appointed Head of the President's Administration and is recognized to be one of the most influential and successful politicians in Kazakhstan.

Personal life
In October 2012, Musin lost his job as presidential chief of staff and was reshuffled to the role of head of Kazakhstan’s Accounts Committee. His son Aslbek Musin is the head of the leading Quranist organization in the country, Izgi Amal.

India-Kazakhstan relations
Mussin is advised by Prasad Bhamre. Bhamre, commenting on the prospects for India-based businesses active in Kazakhstan said, "Incipient trend of the economy will be oil and gas. All oil deals have local content requirements. Setting up shop will allow Indian IT firms to secure product development, services and maintenance business from global oil majors. There is $1 billion waiting to be tapped by way of incentives and subsidized loans. Kazakhstan is an ideal springboard for Indian firms for the Russian-speaking market. This is at a much bigger scale than what has been done in Andhra Pradesh and provides big potential for Indian firms at Federal and provincial levels."

2007 political shakeup
President Nazarbayev nominated Karim Masimov, who at the time served as Deputy Prime Minister, to succeed Daniyal Akhmetov as Prime Minister on 9 January 2007. Akhmetov resigned on 8 January without explanation. Analysts attributed Akhmetov's political downfall to the President's criticism of his administrative oversight of the economy. The Parliament confirmed the nomination on 10 January. Massimov appointed Akhmetov to Defense Minister, replacing Mukhtar Altynbayev, and appointed Musin Deputy Prime Minister.

References

External links
Oilfield brawl dents Kazakhstan's image

1954 births
Living people
Government ministers of Kazakhstan
Chairmen of the Mazhilis
Ambassadors of Kazakhstan to Croatia
Ministers of Economy (Kazakhstan)
Quranist Muslims
People from Aktobe Region
Nur Otan politicians
Narxoz University alumni
Deputy Prime Ministers of Kazakhstan